Kamettia is a genus of flowering plant sin the family Apocynaceae first described as a genus in 1834. It is native to  India and Thailand.

Species
 Kamettia caryophyllata (Roxb.) Nicolson & Suresh - W + S India
 Kamettia chandeei D.J.Middleton - Thailand

References

Apocynaceae genera
Rauvolfioideae